1974 in politics covers information on political events occurred worldwide.

Events
January 2 - Richard Nixon signs a bill lowering the maximum U.S. speed limit to 55 MPH in order to conserve gasoline during an OPEC embargo.
 January 4 - U.S. President Richard Nixon refuses to hand over materials subpoenaed by the Senate Watergate Committee.
 February 22 - Pakistan recognizes Bangladesh.
 February 28 - After seven years, the United States and Egypt re-establish diplomatic relations. 
 February 28 - General election in the U.K. results in no majority for any party; Labour will form a minority government until October despite having received fewer votes nationally than the Conservatives. See February 1974 United Kingdom general election.
March 4 - Harold Wilson replaces Edward Heath as Prime Minister of the UK.
 March 1 - Watergate scandal: Seven are indicted for their role in the Watergate break-in and charged with conspiracy to obstruct justice.
 April 25 - Portuguese democratic revolution.
 May 18 - "Smiling Buddha" nuclear weapon test by India.
 June 29 - Isabel Perón replaces Juan Perón as President of Argentina.
 July 20 - Turkey invades the country of Cyprus and occupies the northern third of the island (later declared the Turkish Republic of Northern Cyprus).
 August 9 - President Richard Nixon of the USA resigns, and is replaced with Gerald Ford.
 September 1 - Acting Hugh Watt replaces deceased Norman Kirk as Prime Minister of New Zealand.
 September 6 - Bill Rowling replaces acting Hugh Watt as Prime Minister of New Zealand.
 September 12 - Ethiopian Emperor Haile Selassie ousted in a coup by the Derg.
 October 10 - General election in the UK is won narrowly by Labour. See October 1974 United Kingdom general election.

Births

Deaths

See also
 1973 in politics
 other events of 1974
 List of years in politics

References

 
Politics by year
20th century in politics
1970s in politics